Iwikauikaua was a Hawaiian high chief of Oʻahu.

Family
He was a son of the chief Makakaualiʻi and chiefess Kapukāmola and grandson of Kūkaʻilani.

His wives included Hawaiian Queen Keakamahana. with whom he had a daughter, Queen Keakealaniwahine. With Kauākahikuaʻanaʻauakāne (w) he was the father of Kāneikaiwilani (k) who married his half sister Keakealaniwahine.

He was a grandfather of King Keaweʻīkekahialiʻiokamoku and Queen Kalanikauleleiaiwi.

His kapu was the burning kukui torch at midday, which his descendant Kalākaua used to symbolize his own dynasty.

References

Royalty of Oahu
House of Kalākaua
Hawaiian monarchs
Royalty of Hawaii (island)